Elachista gregori is a moth of the family Elachistidae. It is found in Latvia, Germany, the Czech Republic, Slovakia and Austria.

The larvae feed on Poaceae species, possibly Nardus stricta and/or Koeleria glauca. They mine the leaves of their host plant.

References

gregori
Moths described in 1988
Moths of Europe